Aleksandar Stanković may refer to:

, Yugoslav Partisan
Aleksandar Stanković (footballer, born 1998), Serbian football player, goalkeeper
Aleksandar Stanković (footballer, born 2005), Serbian football player
, Serbian general
, Croatian TV host and journalist
Alex M. Stanković, Serbian-born American engineer